Dodge Glacier, is a glacier in northwestern Greenland. Administratively it belongs to the Avannaata municipality.

The glacier was named by Isaac Israel Hayes (1832 – 1881) after expedition member Henry W. Dodge during the American Arctic Expedition of 1860 – 1861.

Geography 
The Dodge Glacier has its terminus in the Smith Sound, east of Cape Alexander (Ullersuaq), north of the Storm Glacier. The Dodge and Storm glaciers don't discharge directly from the Greenland Ice Sheet, but from an ice cap located at the southwestern end of Inglefield Land which is attached to the Ice Sheet from the southeast. 

In the same manner as the neighboring Storm Glacier, the Dodge Glacier has retreated significantly in recent years.

See also
List of glaciers in Greenland
Operation IceBridge

References

External links
Early Results from NASA's Ocean-Ice Mission in Greenland

Glaciers of Greenland